Walter Maximillian Bastian (November 16, 1891 – March 12, 1975) was a United States circuit judge of the United States Court of Appeals for the District of Columbia Circuit and previously was a United States district judge of the United States District Court for the District of Columbia.

Education and career

Born in Washington, D.C., Bastian received a Bachelor of Laws from Georgetown Law in 1913. He served as a first lieutenant in chemical warfare service of the United States Army during World War I. He was in private practice in Washington, D.C., from 1915 to 1950. He was a lecturer at the National University School of Law from 1918 to 1948.

Federal judicial service

Bastian received a recess appointment from President Harry S. Truman on October 23, 1950, to a seat on the United States District Court for the District of Columbia vacated by Judge Jennings Bailey. He was nominated to the same position by President Truman on November 27, 1950. He was confirmed by the United States Senate on December 14, 1950, and received his commission on December 22, 1950. His service terminated on December 15, 1954, due to his elevation to the District of Columbia Circuit.

Bastian received a recess appointment from President Dwight D. Eisenhower on September 20, 1954, to a seat on the United States Court of Appeals for the District of Columbia Circuit vacated by Judge Bennett Champ Clark. He was nominated to the same position by President Eisenhower on November 8, 1954. He was confirmed by the Senate on December 2, 1954, and received his commission the next day. He assumed senior status on March 16, 1965. His service terminated on March 12, 1975, due to his death.

Other service

Bastian served as president of the board of directors of the National Conference on Citizenship in 1960.

References

Sources
 

1891 births
1975 deaths
Georgetown University Law Center alumni
Judges of the United States District Court for the District of Columbia
United States district court judges appointed by Harry S. Truman
20th-century American judges
Judges of the United States Court of Appeals for the D.C. Circuit
United States court of appeals judges appointed by Dwight D. Eisenhower
United States Army officers